Untidy (foaled 1920 in New Jersey) was an American Thoroughbred filly racehorse owned by Helen Hay Whitney's Greentree Stable and trained by Jimmy Rowe Jr. and head trainer Scott Harlan. Untidy's performance in 1923 would see her named in retrospective as the American Champion Three-Year-Old Filly.

Racing career
A winner at age two of a maiden race, Untidy came into her own at age three. She was trained by Jimmy Rowe Jr. for her wins in the Kentucky Oaks and Gazelle Stakes. In August, Greentree Stables' head trainer Scott Harlan took over and was the trainer of record for Untidy's win in the Alabama Stakes.

A filly about whom racing publications frequently remarked on her beauty, in addition to her wins in important stakes races Untidy regularly ran against her male counterparts in top level races. She notably ran second in the 1923 Manhattan Handicap and second to that year's Kentucky Derby winner and future U.S. Racing Hall of Fame colt Zev in the Lawrence Realization Stakes.

Broodmare
In the spring of 1924 Unity was sent to stand as a broodmare at the famous Rancocas Stud in Jobstown, New Jersey. Of her offspring, the most successful in racing was First Minstrel, a winner for Greentree Stable of the Junior Champion and Sanford Stakes in 1933.

Pedigree

References

1920 racehorse births
Thoroughbred racehorses
Racehorses bred in New Jersey
Racehorses trained in the United States
American racehorses
American Champion racehorses
Thoroughbred family 1-h